Case Management Model and Notation (CMMN) is a graphical representation for graphically expressing a Case, as well as an interchange format for exchanging Case models among different tools.

In this context: "A Case is a proceeding that involves actions taken regarding a subject in a particular situation to achieve a desired outcome" and it is derived from the concept of Case management used e.g. in the legal and medical worlds.

While BPMN deals with predictable processes, CMMN is more oriented to focus on supporting processes that are intrinsically unpredictable, not repeatable, weakly-structured, and knowledge-intensive.

CMMN can often require ad-hoc actions.

A consortium of 11 companies contributed to the development of CMMN, which is now being maintained by the Object Management Group. Version 1.0 of CMMN was released in May 2014 and amended by Version 1.1 in December 2016.

See also
 Advanced case management
BPMN
Business Process Management
Business Process Modeling
 Comparison of Business Process Modeling Notation tools
 Decision Model and Notation

References

External links
 OMG CMMN Specification

Diagrams
Workflow technology
Business process modelling
ISO standards
Modeling languages